Manuel Lelo (born 18 August 1987) is an Angolan competitive sailor. He competed at the 2016 Summer Olympics in Rio de Janeiro, in the men's Laser class. He finished in 46th place. He returned to the Tokyo 2020 Olympics to coach the Angola Men's 470 team of Matias Montinho and
Paixão Afonso.

References

External links
 

1987 births
Living people
Angolan male sailors (sport)
Olympic sailors of Angola
Sailors at the 2016 Summer Olympics – Laser